Glenbrook station is a commuter rail stop on the New Canaan Branch of the Metro-North Railroad's New Haven Line, located in the Glenbrook section of Stamford, Connecticut.

Station layout
The station has one four-car-long high-level side platform with two waiting shelters to the east of the track. The platform is situated between the grade crossings of Glenbrook Road to the south and Crescent Street to the north. There are no ticket machines.

The station is owned and operated by the Connecticut Department of Transportation (ConnDOT), with some responsibilities delegated to Metro-North. Parking is managed by the city of Stamford. CT Transit Stamford provides bus service from the station.

History

Glenbrook was formerly served by two stations – one on the New York–New Haven mainline, and one on the New Canaan Branch. The mainline station, located at Courtland Avenue, was closed in the early 1970s. The station has been unstaffed since January 15, 1972.

In 2007, city officials were considering the idea of building a second train station in the area, possibly at the original mainline station site. In December 2010, Connecticut Governor M. Jodi Rell announced that the state Bonding Commission was expected to approve $950,000 in financing for a canopy.

References

External links

 Station from Crescent Street from Google Maps Street View
 Station from Glenbrook Road from Google Maps Street View
 http://www.ct.gov/dot/lib/dot/documents/dpt/1_Station_Inspection_Summary_Report.pdf

Metro-North Railroad stations in Connecticut
Stations along New York, New Haven and Hartford Railroad lines
Buildings and structures in Stamford, Connecticut
Railroad stations in Fairfield County, Connecticut
Railway stations in the United States opened in 1868
1868 establishments in Connecticut